Planning Institute of Australia (PIA) is the peak national body representing town planning and the planning profession in Australia. PIA represents approximately 5000 members nationally and internationally. It is governed by a National Board of Directors and managed by a professional administration. It is a member-based organisation with its management complemented by volunteers, who support and contribute to its activities on various levels.

PIA runs a number of events at both the National and State/Territory levels, including an annual National Congress, an Annual State Conference in most States/Territories, professional development seminars, and a number of social occasions. PIA also presents State and National Awards for Planning Excellence to recognise and publicise outstanding achievements in planning and design, and has a code of professional conduct to which all members are required to adhere.

PIA is closely aligned with a global network of other planning professional bodies throughout the world including the American Planning Association (APA) and Royal Town Planning Institute.

PIA also publishes Australian Planner, a peer-reviewed journal for the planning profession in Australia and the Pacific Region.

The Planning Institute of Australia holds an annual National Congress on a rotational basis between the capital cities.

Background 
The origin of the Planning Institute was in early volunteer-based Australian town planning associations comprising a mixture of design professionals (architects, engineers and surveyors) and interested individuals. This included the Town Planning Association of NSW in 1913, and the Western Australian Town Planning Association in 1916.

In the 1930s a growing desire on the part of the qualified professionals to create advocacy groups modelled after the British Town and Country Planning Institute led to the formation of various state and City-based institutes. In their early years there was sometimes conflict between the institutes and volunteer-based associations.

The first of these bodies was the Town Planning Institute of Western Australia, formed by Harold Boas in 1931 and lasting only 4 years.

By 1950, various Australian professional associations representing town planners had consolidated into the Town Planning Institute of Australia (representing Victoria, Western Australia and Tasmania), the Town Planning Institute of South Australia and the NSW-based Town and Country Planning Institute of Australia. In January 1951, all three institutes met in Melbourne and formally agreed to amalgamate as the Regional and Town Planning Institute with Arthur Winston as the first president. This organisation became the only national organisation representing qualified urban and regional planners and other related disciplines in Australia.

It later became the Royal Australian Planning Institute until 2002, when the current name was adopted.

University affiliation

The institute works closely Australian universities providing accreditation to town planning courses and programs. The current list of accredited programs includes:

ACT
 University of Canberra (Bachelor of Planning Accreditation: to 2012)
 University of Canberra (Master of Urban and Regional Planning Accreditation: to 2014)
New South Wales
 University of Sydney
 University of New South Wales
 University of Technology, Sydney
 Macquarie University
 University of New England
 Charles Sturt University
 University of Western Sydney
Northern Territory
 Northern Territory University
Queensland
 University of Queensland
 Griffith University
 Queensland University of Technology
 James Cook University
 University of Sunshine Coast
 Bond University
South Australia
 University of Adelaide
 University of South Australia – Master of Urban and Regional Planning 
 Flinders University
Tasmania
 University of Tasmania
Western Australia
 Curtin University
 University of Western Australia
Victoria
 La Trobe University
 RMIT University
 University of Melbourne
 Deakin University
 Victoria University

See also
Urban planning in Australia

References

External links
Planning Institute Australia official website

Professional associations based in Australia
Professional planning institutes
Urban planning in Australia